American Television Distribution licenses television series and films for syndication in domestic and international outlets.  The company is headed by Tommy Habeeb.   The show Billionaires Car Club is hosted by Andrew Firestone and is currently airing internationally.  September 1, 2007 will be the live Art of War 3 Pay-Per-View Event from American Airlines Center in Dallas, Texas

Current Shows 

STAG
Billionaires Car Club
Art of War 3

External links
Official Website
STAG Official Website
Billionaires Car Club Official Website
Art of War 3 Pay-Per-View

Television syndication distributors